The Borra Caves (also called Borra Guhalu) are located on the East Coast of India, in the Ananthagiri hills of the Araku Valley (with hill ranges' elevation varying from ) of the Alluri Sitharama Raju district  in Andhra Pradesh.
The native name for the caves is Borra Guhalu. Where Borra means abdomen in Telugu language and guhalu means caves in Telugu language

Etymology
The name 'Borra came from an Desia Odia word 'Bora', which means "a hole", as the district shares its Long border line with Odisha, hence the name comes.

Legend
On the discovery of the caves, there are several legends, which the tribals (Jatapu, Porja, Kondadora, Nookadora, valmiki etc.) who inhabit the villages around the caves narrate. The popular legend is that a cow, grazing on the top of the caves, dropped  through a hole in the roof. The cowherd while searching for the cow came across the caves. He found a stone inside the cave that resembled a Lingam, which he interpreted as the Lord Shiva who protected the cow. The village folk who heard the story believed it and since then they have built a small temple for Lord Shiva outside the cave. People flock to the temple for worship and the cave to get a glimpse of the Lingam.

Another lyrical legend is that the Shiva Lingam representing the Hindu God Lord Shiva, is found deep in the caves and above which is a stone formation of a cow (Sanskrit: Kamadhenu). It is surmised that the udder of this cow is the source of the Gosthani (Sanskrit: Cow's udder) River which originates from here, flows through Vizianagram and Visakhapatnam districts before emptying into the Bay of Bengal near Bheemunipatnam.

Geography and climate

The caves are located in the Araku Valley of the Ananthagiri hill range and is drained by the Gosthani River. At the entry, the cave measures up to  horizontally and  vertically. Stalagmite and stalactite formations are found in the caves.

The Gosthani river provides water supply to the Visakhapatnam city.

Geology

The regional geology in the Eastern Ghats mobile belt, where the caves are located, is represented by the khondalite suite of rocks (garnetiferous sillimanite gneisses, quartzo-feldsphatic garnet gneisses) of Archaen age. Quaternary deposits consist of red bed sediments, laterites, pediment fans, colluvium, alluvium and coastal sands.
The caves in the reserved forest area basically host a variety of speleothems of various sizes and irregularly shaped stalactites and stalagmites. The pyroxenite outcrops are dark and massive and include discontinuous calc-silicate bands, some of brown mica and others with calcite.

Formation
The Gosthani River, which originates from these caves and flows between the solidified stalactites and stalagmites in the karstic limestones formation, is the cause for the development of the odd shapes of structures. Water percolating from the roof of the caves dissolve limestone and trickle drop by drop to form stalactites at the roof of the cave and then dripping down to the ground form stalagmites. These deposits have developed into interesting forms and structures inside the caves such as Shiva–Parvati, Mother–Child, Rishi's beard, human brain, mushrooms, crocodile, temple, church, etc. These shapes have captured the imagination of tourists, while some have been given religious interpretations.

Formations in the caves 

The caves are deep and totally aphotic. There is an area in the caves with limited light penetration. Sulfur springs discharge into the cave passages causing corrosion of limestone. The spring waters display floating mucus-like biofilms.

These are thick orange microbial mats ( thick) with patches of yellow biofilms extending  from the aphotic deep cave orifice.

While the caves are basically limestone formations, the area surrounding these are of mica formations which are prospected for precious stones like rubies.

Archeological artifacts (Paleolithic implements) have been found in the caves. The excavations carried out in the caves by the archeologists of the Andhra University, have unearthed stone tools of middle Paleolithic culture dating back 30,000 to 50,000 years, which confirm human habitation.

Genesis
Speleothem carbonates found in the caves have been subject to scientific studies. In fluviatile, spring, cave and soil environments microbial carbonates are important. In the biofilms and/or microbial mats, which are formed in the caves, the principal organisms associated are bacteria, particularly cyanobacteria, small algae and fungi. Petrographic analysis of a thin section has uncovered the presence of lithified structures and micrite, present as laminated to clotted with chocolate-brown blebs. These are identical to microbialites observed in modern and ancient stromatolitic carbonates. Laboratory observations with scanning electron microscope (SEM) have also confirmed the presence of calcified bacteria, micro-rods, and needle calcite. Organic mats (yellow-orange in colour) are made up of mineralized filamentous bacteria, bacterial stalks, cells and sheaths. Thus, these studies have indicated that microorganisms have actively influenced the genesis of speleothems of the Borra Caves.

Biological environment

Micro organisms

The effect of microorganisms in the mats on the cave formation and their role on iron mineral precipitation has been further studied. A report indicates a link between iron–rich mats formation and iron precipitating bacteria.

Fauna and flora

The fauna observed in the caves are predominantly bats, as well as the golden gecko. The type of bat reported is the fulvous fruit bat (Rousettus leschenaultii) – a species which roosts in large caves, old buildings, dungeons and dark areas of old forts. This species has short and slender musculature with large, well developed eyes. They feed on flowers and fruits, particularly jamun, guava, silk, cotton and mango.

Stygofauna

Habrobathynella borraensis was described from the Borra Caves. It is the first Indian cavernicolous species of the genus Habrobathynella.

Location and access

The caves are located in the Ananthagiri hills range of the Araku valley of the Alluri Sitharama Raju district  in Andhra Pradesh. The caves are well connected by road, rail and air services. It is mostly a hill road and the journey takes about three hours.

Train services operate on the Kothavalasa-Kirandul railway line in East Coast Railway, Indian Railways. The journey by train takes about five hours to the Railway Station near the caves called the Borra Guhalu Railway station.

Visitor information

Guided tours for a day trip to the Borra Caves cover interesting attractions like the Tyada Railway Tunnel, Damuku View Point, Ananthagiri Coffee Plantation, Padmapuram Gardens and the Araku Valley. For the benefit of the visitors, an information board at the entry point to the caves gives some details of the caves and its surroundings (pictured).
An Arraku and Borra rail-cum-road package tour organized by the Andhra Pradesh State Tourism Department is available for visitors keen to see the Borra Caves.
A walk around the caves provides views of the mountainous area which is rich in flora and fauna. The Andhra Pradesh State Tourism Department has installed 26 mercury, sodium vapor and halogen electric lamps, which provide views of the formations.

November and December are ideal months to visit the caves.

See also
 Cave research in India
 List of Caves in India
 List of rock-cut temples in India
 Borra Caves Vizag Visakhapatnam

References

Ramesh Y (1990). Geomorphic Studies in Upper Gostani River Basin with Special References to Borra (Karst) Caves Visakhapatnam District, A.P., India, India.
Le Bas, M.J., Subbarao, K.V. and Walsh, J.W. Metacarbonatite or marble? – the case of the carbonate, pyroxenite, calcite-apatite rock complex at Borra, Eastern Ghats, India, Journal of Asian Earth Sciences, 20, 2002, 127–140.

External links

 Borra Caves

Caves of Andhra Pradesh
Geology of Andhra Pradesh
Show caves in India